Selby railway station is a Grade II listed station which serves the town of Selby in North Yorkshire, England. The original terminus station was opened in 1834 for the Leeds and Selby Railway. The Hull and Selby Railway extended the line in 1840, and a new station was built, with the old station becoming a goods shed. The station was rebuilt in 1873 and 1891, the 1891 rebuilding being required due to the replacement of the swing bridge over the Ouse at the same time.

The area around the station has been the location for the junctions of a number of lines, including the former East Coast Main Line route between Doncaster and York, as well as the Selby to Driffield Line (1848), and the Selby to Goole Line (1910). After 1983 with the opening of the Selby Diversion, Selby is no longer on the East Coast Main Line.

As of 2014 lines lead from Selby to Leeds, Hull and Doncaster. The station is managed by TransPennine Express, and receives regional trains operated by Northern and TransPennine Express, as well as Hull-London services operated by Hull Trains and London North Eastern Railway.

History

1834 station

In 1834 the Leeds and Selby Railway opened, running east west from a terminus station in Marsh Lane, Leeds to a terminus at Selby.

The line opened 22 September 1834, with only one track complete. A train from Leeds set off at 6 am and arrived in Selby around 9 am, to a general celebration. When general service started the journey took about 65 minutes. The main stations were not completed until a few months after the line opened; the Selby terminus at a cost of £10,300. Both tracks of the line were completed by 15 December 1834.

Station offices and other buildings were built adjoining the station. The train shed had six lines of track, four for freight and two for passengers. Lines for coal and lime were separate, outside the shed to the east, the offices at the northwest corner. The line of rails continued through the station to a wharf on the River Ouse. Journeys to Hull were completed by Packet boat from Selby.

After construction of the new station in 1840, with the connection on the Hull and Selby Railway old station became a goods station.

The rail links to the old station were removed in the 1980s. As of 2009 the station is used as warehousing by Viking Shipping Services Ltd.

1840 station

In 1840, the Hull and Selby Railway was opened. To cross the River Ouse, a bascule lifting bridge was installed, northwest of the old station. At that time ships had priority over railway traffic.

The Hull and Selby, and Leeds and Selby railways connected 'end on' at Selby, west of the old station; the Leeds and Selby Line diverged from its old terminus path at a junction near the crossing of Park street; the line of the railway ran a short distance west, and parallel to the track in the original station. A new through station was built, and the old station became a goods station.

1873  station
In 1871 the NER opened two new sections of track, from Shaftholme junction (4 miles north of Doncaster) to Selby Old West junction (Selby), and from Barlby junction (across the Ouse from Selby) to Chaloner's Whin junction (Dringhouses, York); these formed a new route for the East Coast Main Line.

A new station was constructed from between 1870 and 1873, built by Thomas Nelson to a design from Thomas Prosser's office in the NER.

1891 station

In 1891 a new swing bridge was built downstream (east) of the original over the Ouse (see 1891 Selby swing bridge). The priority of river traffic over rail traffic was reversed on completion of the new bridge; crossings by rail were more than ten times more numerous than river craft.

As a consequence of the shift in the path of the railway the old station was rebuilt. The down (west) platforms were retained and modified, whilst the up (east) platforms were moved eastwards, re-using and extending Prosser's platform roof. The architect for the remodelling and extension was the NER's William Bell.

History of rail transport at Selby
In addition to the main lines west to Leeds (Leeds & Selby, 1834), east to Hull (Hull & Selby, 1840), and north and south to York and Doncaster (York & Doncaster branch, 1871), the rail system at Selby was the location for a number of junctions to other lines, and other facilities.

A branch from the Hull line (near Barlby to Market Weighton) opened in 1848. (see Selby and Market Weighton Railway) The line ran from Cliffe junction east of the Ouse south of Barlby, around a mile east of Selby.

The Cawood, Wistow and Selby Light Railway (CW&SLR) was opened in 1898 linking the Leeds & Selby Railway to the village of Cawood. Until 1904 the line had a separate station, Brayton Gates, 1 mile west of Selby. The line was predominantly used for agricultural traffic but also carried passengers until 1930, its final closure taking place in 1960.

The Selby to Goole Line opened in 1910, ran via the villages of Barlow, Drax and Rawcliffe to Goole. The line closed in 1964 as a result of the Beeching report.  A short section of the line was used to access a ballast tip near Barlow until 1983.

In the mid 20th century the 'Loop Line' was converted into a triangle junction by the addition of a short chord between the Selby-Doncaster and Selby-Leeds lines.

In 1983 the Selby Diversion of the East Coast Main Line was opened, avoiding the area around Selby due to possible subsidence from the drift mining works of the Selby Coalfield. As a result, Selby ceased to be a through route on the ECML. The 1871 line from Selby to York was closed on 24 May 1983 and in 1989 was converted into a cycle track which now forms part of route 65 of the National Cycle Network.  The line south to Temple Hirst Junction was retained  – it is in regular use for both passenger & freight traffic and also serves as a diversionary route for Doncaster to Hull services if the line via Goole is closed for any reason.

Engine sheds and industrial branches
An engine shed was built 1870–2, in the V of the junction between the lines to Doncaster and Leeds. The shed was a standard NER design roundhouse by Prosser in a square overall shed, with 20 tracks. The shed was extended to a similar extent in 1896–8 with an adjacent square shed to a design by Bell. In around 1900 a short "Loop Line" was built south of the station, altering the path to the Leeds line by forming a junction on the Doncaster line further south, beyond the engine sheds. The original route out of Selby to Leeds became peripheral, part of the sidings associated with the engine sheds.

There was also a Canal works (dye and leather chemicals) east of the Doncaster line,  on the banks of the Selby Canal, connected by sidings from the mid 20th century. Also on the Selby side of the Ouse were sidings for the gas works, and for a wood yard, and for the 'Ousegate Maltings' as well as accommodation sidings for the Goods shed.

On the far bank of the Ouse there were industrial sidings: A seed mill north of the line had been established by in 1909 with a rail connection; this developed into a large mill Olympia Mills, later part Jurgens (1919), Unilever (1929), and BOCM (1952). (now part of BOCM Pauls, not rail connected).

Also on the far bank a Sugar Beet factory, was rail connected from the south side Hull-Selby line from the mid 20th century. In 1983 the site was acquired by logistics company Potter Group, and redeveloped into a  distribution centre including a rail freight terminal and warehousing. Client occupiers include Cemex (Asphalt concrete, using stone from Peak Forest, Derbyshire), and Clipper Logistics (e-commerce clothing/textile logistics).

Station Masters

Edwin Storey 1866 - 1887
John Bradford Harper 1888 - 1890 (afterwards station master at York)
Samuel Holliday 1890 - 1892 (afterwards station master at York)
James Brown ca. 1894 - 1897 (afterwards station master at York)
William Bell 1897 - 1910
J.G. Waterhouse 1910 - 1912 
John R. Peckitt 1912 - 1924
Walter McGregor 1924 - 1926
G.W. Pattinson 1930 - 1932 (afterwards station master at York)
T.H. Greaves 1932 - 1940
J.H. Barwick 1940 - ????
T. Arnott 1941 - 1942 (formerly station master at Harrogate)
E. Rains ???? - 1948
F.E. Allen 1949 - 1951 (afterwards station master at Stratford)
A. Stabler 1951 - 1955 (formerly station master at West Hartlepool)
H.W. Jones ???? - 1960
A. Ayton 1961 - ????

Facilities
The station is fully staffed, with the ticket office manned throughout the week from start of service until 19:45 (19:00 on Sundays).  A ticket machine is also provided on the Hull-bound platform.  Waiting rooms are located on each side and there is a buffet available in the concourse.  Digital display screens and a public address system provide train running information. Step-free access to all platforms is only available during staffed hours due to the need to use a barrow crossing. A refurbished footbridge to platforms 2 and 3 including passenger lifts is scheduled to open by June 2023.

Current services

To Hull – Monday to Saturdays there are now three trains per hour to Hull. An hourly TransPennine Express service, two per hour run by Northern (one each from York and  via Bradford and Leeds), plus some Hull Trains services from London King's Cross.

To York – there is generally an hourly service daily north to York. A few services start/ terminate here, but most run to and from Hull or Bridlington.

To Leeds – Monday to Saturdays there are two trains per hour to Leeds. One Northern stopping service to Halifax via Bradford Interchange and one TransPennine Express service to Manchester Piccadilly. Evenings and Sundays there is either an hourly or two-hourly TransPennine Express service to Leeds and Manchester plus the Bradford/Halifax local service (Leeds only on Sundays). One service each weekday (and Saturday) morning continues to Manchester Airport.

To London – there are eight trains per day in total via Doncaster to London King's Cross. All London services are operated by Hull Trains except the Hull Executive, which is run by London North Eastern Railway.

LNER also runs an evening service between Hull and Doncaster (calling at Selby).

Northern plan to introduce improved service levels. The current Leeds to Selby stopping service has been extended through to Hull (see above - implemented in December 2019) and the York – Hull line service is now hourly throughout the week (including Sundays).

Trivia
In 2009 Selby  celebrated the 175th anniversary of the opening of the first Selby station.

The station is mentioned in the song "Slow Train" by Flanders and Swann.

Notes

References

Sources

, scanned version lacks the illustrative plates, for Plate.48 see Selby station (Brees, 1839)

External links

Railway stations in North Yorkshire
DfT Category E stations
Former Leeds and Selby Railway stations
Railway stations in Great Britain opened in 1834
Railway stations in Great Britain closed in 1840
Former York and North Midland Railway stations
Railway stations in Great Britain opened in 1840
Railway stations served by Hull Trains
Northern franchise railway stations
Railway stations served by TransPennine Express
Railway stations served by London North Eastern Railway
Selby
Thomas Prosser railway stations
Grade II listed buildings in North Yorkshire